Lou Noel (born 25 November 2000) is a French rugby sevens player. She won a bronze medal at the 2022 Rugby World Cup Sevens.

References 

Living people
2000 births
French rugby sevens players
France international women's rugby sevens players